Darrell Atchison is an American politician and businessman serving as a member of the Missouri House of Representatives from the 153rd district. Elected in November 2020, he assumed office on January 6, 2021.

Early life and education 
Atchison was born in St. Louis and moved to Williamsville, Missouri, at the age of 12. After graduating from Poplar Bluff High School, he earned an associate's degree from Three Rivers College and a Bachelor of Science in business from Tarkio College.

Career 
From 1981 to 2004, Atchison served as a maintenance and logistics officer in the Missouri National Guard, retiring with the rank of major. He was also the founder and president of Four A Enterprises, manufacturing and assembly business. Since 2008, he has worked as a financial representative for Modern Woodmen of America. Atchison was elected to the Missouri House of Representatives in November 2020 and assumed office on January 6, 2021.

References 

Living people
Republican Party members of the Missouri House of Representatives
People from St. Louis
People from St. Louis County, Missouri
People from Wayne County, Missouri
Tarkio College alumni
Year of birth missing (living people)